Ante Crnac (born 17 December 2003) is a Croatian professional footballer who plays as a left winger or attacking midfielder for Prva HNL club NK Slaven Belupo.

Club career
On 24 January 2022, Crnac moved from Dinamo and signed a 3-year contract with Slaven Belupo.

International career 
He has been capped for various Croatian youth national teams.

References

External links

Profile - Slaven Belupo

2003 births
Living people
People from Sisak
People from Kutina
Association football wingers
Croatian footballers
Croatia youth international footballers
NK Slaven Belupo players
GNK Dinamo Zagreb II players
Croatian Football League players
First Football League (Croatia) players